Anju Chadha is an Indian biochemist. She is a professor at Indian Institute of Technology Madras. She works in the fields of biocatalysis and enzyme mechanisms, enzymes in organic synthesis, asymmetric synthesis using enzymes, chirotechnology, green chemistry and biosensors.

Early life
Chadha was born in Ahmednagar in India.

Education

In high school she was named best student. While getting her bachelor's degree at Nowrosjee Wadia College, she was awarded a Maharashtra State Government Scholarship. She was also awarded a prize in chemistry from the college. She graduated with her degree in chemistry in 1975. She received her Masters of Science in 1977 from the University of Poona with an emphasis in chemistry. In 1984, she completed her PhD from the Indian Institute of Science, Bangalore. She focused on bio-organic chemistry.

Work

Chadha is a lifetime member of the Indian Society of Bio-organic Chemists, the Chemical Research Society of India, and the IISc Alumni Association, Bangalore. She is also an elected member of Madras Science Foundation.

Recognition

1975 - Chemistry Prize, Nowrosjee Wadia College, Poona, India
1985 - Mrs. Hanumantha Rao Medal, Indian Institute of Science, Bangalore, India
1985 - Fellow, Fogarty International Center, National Institutes of Health, Washington, D.C.
1992 - Fellow, Alexander von Humboldt Foundation
2011 - International Women's Day Award from the University of Madras

References

Indian biochemists
Living people
20th-century Indian women scientists
21st-century Indian biologists
Indian women biochemists
Articles created or expanded during Women's History Month (India) - 2014
Academic staff of IIT Madras
Savitribai Phule Pune University alumni
People from Ahmednagar
Scientists from Maharashtra
Indian Institute of Science alumni
20th-century Indian biologists
Women scientists from Maharashtra
21st-century Indian women scientists
Year of birth missing (living people)